Pittsburgh–Monroeville Airport  is a private airport located one nautical mile (1.8 km) north of the central business district of Monroeville, in Allegheny County, Pennsylvania, United States. The airport is privately owned by the estate of Helen M. Brown and is also known as the Harold W. Brown Memorial Field.

The airport no longer offers aviation fuel for sale, but 2,000 planes land and take off at the airport every year, according to Weible. Pilots pay $3 on the honor system to defray the expenses of mowing the grass and maintaining the runway for an overnight stay.

The airport also hosts a gathering every other year for the Aero Club of Pittsburgh. The airport buildings also serve as the meeting place for Cadet Squad 604 of the Civil Air Patrol.

The airfield was used as a filming location in a pivotal scene in the 1978 horror film Dawn of the Dead.

History
Harold and Helen Bohinski Brown opened Pittsburgh–Monroeville Airport in 1948. Before it closed in the early 1970s, it was noted for its air shows that attracted hundreds of spectators and for handling the air mail for the Wilmerding Post Office.

Pittsburgh–Monroeville Airport currently houses sixteen privately owned planes in several hangars, down from 74 in 1970, and 112 between 1952 and 1958. A sign along Logans Ferry Road designates the field as Harold W. Brown Memorial Field.

The runway is not plowed nor actively maintained during winter but still operates.

Facilities and aircraft
It has one runway designated 5/23 with a 2,280 by 28 ft (695 x 9 m) asphalt surface. For the 12-month period ending June 12, 2007, the airport had 5,709 aircraft operations, an average of 15 per day: 99.8% general aviation and <0.2% military. At that time there were 17 aircraft based at this airport: 94% single-engine and 6% ultralight.

References

Further reading

External links
 Aerial image as of April 1993 from USGS The National Map

Airports in Pennsylvania
Transportation buildings and structures in Allegheny County, Pennsylvania
Privately owned airports